is a former Japanese voice actress and singer from Tokyo. She was a member of the pop idol unit StylipS. She is currently retired from her voice acting career and graduated from StylipS in May 2016.

Filmography
Bold denotes leading roles.

Anime
 Hanamaru Kindergarten (2010) as Yuna
 High School DxD as Li
 Kono Naka ni Hitori, Imōto ga Iru! (2012) as Kurumi Kashinoki 
 Saki Achiga-hen episode of Side-A (2012) as Izumi Nijō
 Love Live! School Idol Project - Erena Toudou (2013)
 Love Live! School Idol Project 2nd Season - Erena Toudou (2014)
 Love Live! The School Idol Movie - Erena Toudou (2015)

References

External links
 Official blog 
 

1993 births
Living people
A-Rise members
Japanese women pop singers
Japanese idols
Japanese video game actresses
Japanese voice actresses
StylipS members
Voice actresses from Tokyo
21st-century Japanese actresses
21st-century Japanese singers
21st-century Japanese women singers